Kanchana Silpa-archa (born 15 February 1960) is a Thai politician who has served as the leader of the Chartthaipattana Party. She previously served as Deputy Minister of the Ministry of Education from 1999 to 2001.

Early life 
Kanchana was born on 15 February 1960 at Chao Phraya Yommarat Hospital in Suphan Buri, Thailand. She is one of the three children of former Prime Minister Banharn Silpa-archa and Jamsai Silpa-archa. She is the niece of former Deputy Prime Minister Chumpol Silpa-archa.

In 1996, she was dragged by her father, who was facing allegations of corruption and incompetence, while being interviewed by the media after she called for his resignation.

Education 
Kanchana completed her lower secondary education at Rajini School and at Triam Udom Suksa School for her higher secondary education. She graduated in 1981 with a with first-class honor in a bachelor's degree in statistics from the Faculty of Commerce and Accountancy from Chulalongkorn University and went on to graduate in 1983 from a master's degree in business administration from University of Wisconsin–Madison.

Political career 
From 1995 to 2008, Kanchana was a member of the Thai House of Representatives representing Suphan Buri Province. During Prime Minister Chuan Leekpai's second administration, she was appointed as Deputy Minister of the Ministry of Education.

She also became a member of the National Legislative Assembly in 2006 after the coup d'etat.

Upon the dissolution of Thai Nation Party on 2 December 2008 by the Constitutional Court of Thailand due to electoral fraud charges, she was one of the party executives who were banned to participate from Thai politics for five years. After the ban lapsed, she rejoined politics by filing her candidacy as the second party-list representative under Chartthaipattana Party.

On 26 October 2018, Chartthaipattana Party convened to elect its new leader. Kanchana was nominated for the position alongside fellow party member Theera Wongsamut. However, Theera declined the nomination which paved the way for Kanchana to become the party's new leader. Prior to the convention, her brother Varawut Silpa-archa was speculated to lead the party.

References

External links 
 Kanchana Silpa-archa on Chartthaipattana Party website
 Kanchana Silpa-archa on Thai House of Representatives website

Kanchana Silpa-archa
Kanchana Silpa-archa
Kanchana Silpa-archa
Kanchana Silpa-archa
Kanchana Silpa-archa
Kanchana Silpa-archa
Kanchana Silpa-archa
Wisconsin School of Business alumni
1960 births
Living people
Kanchana Silpa-archa
Kanchana Silpa-archa